The ATM 96 is a plastic cased Austrian anti-tank mine produced by Dynamit Nobel Wien. The mine had a dome-shaped pressure plate and an optional tilt rod fuse.

Specifications
 Weight: 250 mm (approx)
 Width: 250 mm (approx)
 Height: 150 mm (approx)

References

 Jane's Mine and Mine Clearance 2005-2006

Anti-tank mines
Land mines of Austria